The 2023 Kent State Golden Flashes football team will represent Kent State University as a member of the Mid-American Conference in the 2023 NCAA Division I FBS football season. The Golden Flashes expect to be led by former Minnesota associate head coach Kenni Burns in his first year as Kent State's head coach. They play their home games at Dix Stadium in Kent, Ohio.

Schedule

References

Kent State
Kent State Golden Flashes football seasons
Kent State Golden Flashes football